Bummy may refer to:

Nickname
 Walter C. Booth (1874–1944), head coach of the Nebraska college football program
 Henry Bumstead (1915–2006), American film art director and production designer, two-time Oscar winner
 Al Davis (boxer) (1920–1945), American boxer
 Calvin Symonds (born 1932), Bermudian retired cricketer and footballer

Fictional characters
 Bummy Pfitzer, on the British sitcom On the Buses (1969–1973)
 Bummy, on the 1973–1974 TV show Lotsa Luck, an American remake of On the Buses
 Bummy, one of the mascots of the Seoul International Cartoon and Animation Festival

See also
 Tropical Fantasy, a soft drink sometimes called "Bummies"
 Bummi (disambiguation)

Lists of people by nickname